James Plaintain (fl. 1720–1728, John or James, last name also Plantain) was a pirate active in the Indian Ocean. He is best known for using his pirate wealth to found a short-lived kingdom on Madagascar.

History

Plantain was English, born in Jamaica, and served as a sailor aboard Edward England’s pirate flotilla (having once served on Christopher Condent's Dragon) which captured the East India Company ship Cassandra from Captain James Macrae in 1720. After looting the ship the collected pirates sailed to Madagascar, divided their plunder, and sailed their separate ways. Plantain and a number of others remained behind, some voluntarily and some not. With two others he moved to Ranter Bay (site of modern Rantabe), spending his plunder and befriending the Malagasay natives to build a settlement. He styled himself “King of Ranter Bay.”

He organized the locals to make war against their neighbors, using firearms to swing the battles his way. He kept himself and his allies supplied by trading with passing ships, offering food, water, supplies, and slaves taken as captives in wars against his neighbors in exchange for guns, gunpowder and shot, clothes, and other goods. The pirates, Plantain included, took multiple Malagasay wives and lavished them with treasures. He demanded the granddaughter of a neighboring king as his wife; the king refused, setting off a series of wars and counter-raids, from which Plantain eventually emerged victorious.

A Royal Navy squadron visited Madagascar in 1722 looking for Richard Taylor, Olivier Levasseur, and Edward England. Plantain advised them that the pirates had long since departed and invited the officers to visit his settlement. Reportedly England himself was present, haggard and near death; he had been deposed from command by Taylor on the grounds of being too kind to the Cassandra’s Captain.

Having made too many enemies on Madagascar Plantain took his favored wife and moved to India in 1728, serving in the Maratha navy under the Maratha Admiral Kanhoji Angre. Plantain’s ultimate fate is not known. When he left to fight various battles he generally buried his wealth on the island and dug it up when he returned, but rumors of Plantain’s buried treasure persisted.

See also
Adam Baldridge, Edward Welch, and Abraham Samuel, two other ex-pirates who established trading posts on or near Madagascar.
John Leadstone, an ex-pirate nicknamed "Old Captain Crackers" who established a trading post on the west coast of Africa.

References

18th-century pirates
Year of birth missing
Year of death missing
18th-century Jamaican people
British pirates
Malagasy pirates
Piracy in the Indian Ocean